Titanodula grandis, also known as the giant Asian mantis, is a species of praying mantis native to the region around the Bay of Bengal in southern Asia. It is found in north-eastern India, Bangladesh, and Myanmar.  It is a large mantis which grows up to 4 inches long.

Taxonomy 
T. grandis was originally placed in Hierodula, but a 2020 study moved the species to a new genus, Titanodula, based on its large size and the unique shape of the male genitalia.

References

G
Mantodea of Asia
Insects of India
Insects of Bangladesh
Insects of Myanmar
Insects described in 1870